Marquis Anthony Pleasant (born June 28, 1965) is a former American football wide receiver. After a college career at Southern Methodist, Pleasant played the 1987 NFL season with the Cincinnati Bengals.

Pleasant scored the Mustangs only touchdown in the 1983 Sun Bowl against Alabama.

References 

1965 births
Living people
American football wide receivers
SMU Mustangs football players
Cincinnati Bengals players
National Football League replacement players